Anchuela del Pedregal is a hamlet located in the municipality of Molina de Aragón, in Guadalajara province, Castilla–La Mancha, Spain. As of 2020, it has a population of 12.

Geography 
Anchuela del Pedregal is located 148km east-northeast of Guadalajara, Spain.

References

Populated places in the Province of Guadalajara